Hunts Corners, Hunt's Corner, Hunt Corner, or, variation, may refer to:

 Hunts Corners, Ohio, USA; an unincorporated community in Lyme Township, Huron County
 Hunts Corners, New York State, USA; a hamlet in Clarence township, Erie County
 Hunts Corner, New York State, USA; a hamlet in Tusten township, Sullivan County

See also

 Hunt's Cross, Liverpool, Merseyside, England, UK
 Hunt (disambiguation)
 Corner (disambiguation)